Dimo Nikolaev Krastev (Bulgarian: Димо Николаев Кръстев; born 10 February 2003) is a Bulgarian footballer who plays as a defender or midfielder for Fiorentina.

Career
Krastev was born in Burgas to the former football player of Neftochimic, coach and current director of the Junior Academy Nikolay Krastev. He made his professional debut for the team at only 15 years of age. On March 8, 2019, he joined Fiorentina's academy.

International career
Krastev has played for Bulgaria U15 and U17 teams, becoming the first captain of the latter. In 2021, he was announced as captain of Bulgaria U19.

On 18 May 2021, he received his first call up for Bulgaria U21, for the friendly matches against Russia U21 and Albania U21 on 3 and 6 June. 

On 16 November 2022, Krastev made his debut for the senior Bulgaria national team in a 2–0 win against Cyprus in a friendly match.

Career statistics

Club

Notes

International

References

External links
 

2003 births
Living people
Bulgarian footballers
Association football midfielders
Sportspeople from Burgas
Neftochimic Burgas players
Bulgaria under-21 international footballers
Bulgaria youth international footballers